William Lewis Boyle (27 May 1859 – 2 October 1918) was Liberal Unionist MP for Mid Norfolk. He was the grandson of Vice-Admiral Sir Courtenay Boyle.

The four times he stood in the constituency it was a straight fight between the Liberals and the Liberal Unionists.

He stood unsuccessfully in 1900 and 1906, and won in the two general elections of 1910.

Boyle joined the Conservative Party when it merged with the Liberal Unionists in 1912. He died in office; the resulting by-election had only one candidate because of the wartime truce.

Sources

F.W.S. Craig British Parliamentary Election Results 1885-1918
Whitaker's Almanack 1901 to 1919 editions

Conservative Party (UK) MPs for English constituencies
Liberal Unionist Party MPs for English constituencies
Politics of Norfolk
UK MPs 1910–1918
1859 births
1918 deaths